The Norwegian Building Authority is a Norwegian government agency responsible for managing laws and rules related to building and construction, authorises rules related to documentation of construction materials and their properties, as well as approving companies related to the Plan and Building Act. The agency gives however jurisdiction to local municipalities, along with the County Governor, in appealing individual building permits.

Previously the National Office of Building Technology and Administration, since 1 January 2012, the office is named the Norwegian Building Authority.

Organization 
The Norwegian Building Authority is organized into five departments:
 Department of Construction Process
 Department of Products and Systems
 Department for Central Approval
 Department for Communication
 Department of Internal Services
The agency has offices at Marabous gt 13, Oslo with the exception of the Department for Central Approval which is located in Gjøvik, Oppland.

The agency is subordinate to the Norwegian Ministry of Local Government and Regional Development and located in Oslo.

Regulations 
While newer editions are being revised and edited, the current applicable process and design regulations are:
 SAK10 – Regulations for building permit application and handling, quality control, inspection, and guidelines for qualifying individual and organizations.
 TEK17 – Regulations for technical building limitations which adopt guidelines from Norsk Standard and SINTEF.

References

External links 

Government agencies of Norway